Jorge Steffano (born 11 March 1965) is a Uruguayan judoka. He competed at the 1992 Summer Olympics and the 1996 Summer Olympics.

References

External links
 

1965 births
Living people
Uruguayan male judoka
Olympic judoka of Uruguay
Judoka at the 1992 Summer Olympics
Judoka at the 1996 Summer Olympics
Place of birth missing (living people)